88 Basie Street is a 1983 studio album by Count Basie.

At the 27th Grammy Awards, Count Basie won the Grammy Award for Best Jazz Instrumental Performance, Big Band for 88 Basie Street.

Track listing

Personnel
 Count Basie – piano
 Sammy Nestico – conductor, arranger
 Sonny Cohn – flugelhorn, trumpet
 Bob Summers – flugelhorn, trumpet
 Frank Szabo – flugelhorn, trumpet
 Dale Carley – trumpet
 Jim Crawford – trumpet
 Bill Hughes – trombone
 Grover Mitchell – trombone
 Dennis Wilson – trombone
 Booty Wood – trombone
 Danny Turner – flute, alto saxophone
 Chris Woods – flute, alto saxophone
 Eric Dixon – flute, tenor saxophone
 Eric Schneider – flute, tenor saxophone
 Kenny Hing – tenor saxophone
 John Williams – baritone saxophone
 Joe Pass – guitar
 Cleveland Eaton – double bass
 Dennis Mackrel – drums

Production
 Norman Granz – producer
 Akira Taguchi – producer
 Allen Sides – engineer
 Alan Yoshida – mastering
 Phil DeLancie – remixing

References

Count Basie Orchestra albums
Pablo Records albums
Albums arranged by Sammy Nestico
Albums produced by Norman Granz
Grammy Award for Best Large Jazz Ensemble Album
1983 albums